The 1915 Pleasant Valley earthquake occurred at  in north-central Nevada. With a moment magnitude of 6.8, a surface wave magnitude of 7.7, and a maximum Mercalli intensity of X (Extreme), it was the strongest earthquake ever recorded in the state.

Earthquake
The earthquake remains as one of the best examples ever for evidence of creating fault scarps along the west side of the Tobin Range.

The rupture originated along an unnamed fault somewhere in the eastern side of Pleasant Valley, in north-central Nevada. The epicentral region was mostly uninhabited, so there was little property damage considering the very large magnitude.

Damage
The earthquake's damage was confined to within  of the epicenter. Damage in Kennedy destroyed two adobe houses, collapsed several mine tunnels, and cracked concrete mine foundations. Winnemucca experienced damage to adobe buildings as well, and several multistory brick buildings lost coping and upper wall parts. Many chimneys were destroyed if they were above roof lines. Water tanks were knocked over in Battle Mountain, Kodiak, Lovelock, and Parran. Several ranches reported damage, all by the southern end of Pleasant Valley. More adobe houses were knocked down by the shaking; a masonry chicken house and a hog pen were destroyed; and houses were displaced from their foundations.

Aftershocks
The earthquake had several aftershocks which disturbed a significant amount of land in Northern Nevada.

See also
 List of earthquakes in 1915
 List of earthquakes in the United States
 List of earthquakes in Nevada

References

Further reading

External links

Airel photographs and videos of the ridge.

1915 earthquakes
1915
1915 in Nevada
1915 natural disasters in the United States
October 1915 events